Druimarben is a hamlet on the east shore of Loch Linnhe in Inverness-shire, Scottish Highlands and is in the Scottish council area of Highland.

References

Populated places in Lochaber